The Ultimate was a steel roller coaster located at Lightwater Valley theme park in North Yorkshire, England. Manufactured by British Rail Engineering Limited, the roller coaster opened in 1991 as the longest roller coaster in the world, surpassing The Beast at Kings Island in the United States. It held the record until the opening of Steel Dragon 2000 in Japan.

The Ultimate operated through the 2019 season and was shutdown following the onset of the COVID-19 pandemic. After several years of standing idle, the decision was made to remove the ride in 2023. Park management cited safety concerns and the costs to refurbish the ride as the reason, as well as the park's shift in focus to becoming more family-oriented.

History
The Ultimate was built from an investment of £5.2 million, designed from a concept created by the park's original owner, Robert Staveley. Construction work began in early 1990 and took eighteen months to complete. The roller coaster opened to the public on 17 July 1991.

The engineering design was handled by Big Country Motioneering and Robert Staveley, and the park hired British Rail Engineering Limited to oversee construction. Tubular Engineering manufactured the track. Modifications had to be made to adjust the banking in a few sections during the second half of the ride.

Set within  of woodland, The Ultimate took passengers along  of tubular steel track, featuring two lift hills of  that rested on Canadian redwood trestles. It originally had over the shoulder restraints, but these were removed in favor of a lap bar following complaints.

Closure and Removal
Due to the COVID-19 pandemic, The Ultimate did not operate in 2020. Following their purchase of the park in 2021, Brighton Pier Group stated, "The Ultimate is not dead in the water. It needs some work doing on it, but we are more than conscious of its iconic status. If we can do something with it, then we will. Obviously safety has got to be the priority, so in due course we will have a look at it and make sure it complies with modern standards."

The ride never operated again, and demolition of the ride began in January 2023. Park owners clarified that time and effort was devoted in consideration of the ride's future. They released a statement saying, "The ride has been out of service for some years now and the process of assessing the viability of bringing it back into use was a long one. Nevertheless, given both the investment required to bring it up to acceptable standards of safety and the re-imagining of Lightwater Valley as a family-orientated Adventure Park, we have decided to close The Ultimate permanently and remove it from the park."

As of February 2023, Multiple track sections on the Ultimate have been removed with the trains being placed in a nearby warehouse for storage. It is expected that over the coming days and weeks, the remaining track, supports and other structures on the site will be dismantled and removed from the park. It is unknown what will replace the attraction.

Ride layout
The Ultimate began by exiting the station on a short straight track, followed by a slight curve to the left into the first lift hill. After cresting the lift, the train proceeded into the first drop, followed by two airtime hills, a slight curve to the left, followed by another airtime hill. After another slight curve to the left, the train traveled through a long stretch of straight track that cuts through a patch of woods. Following this section, there was a series of five small airtime hills (aka "bunny hops") that led into the second lift hill. After cresting the top of the second lift, the train continued straight, followed by a curve to the left, followed by another straight section leading into the second drop. Following the second drop, the train weaved through six banked turns that cut through the woods, hugging the terrain. After a series of small airtime hills and slight curves, the train cut through a short tunnel, followed by a helix up and to the left. Following the first helix, the train pulled into a second helix, down and to the right, into another tunnel. Following the second helix, the train continued on a long and slightly curved track into the final brake run, followed by a short lift hill back into the station.

Trains
The Ultimate had two blue trains, and originally one was painted red prior to the 2019 season. The trains consisted of ten cars with two rows of two seats. The front car had a small locomotive modelled on the front, which resulted in the front car having only one row. Each train featured a maximum capacity of 38 riders.

Incidents
In June 1994, a deer from a nearby forest strayed onto the track and was hit by the train. A 12-year-old boy was taken to the hospital as a result of the accident. In September 2014, another collision with a deer on the track occurred. No riders were injured, but the deer was killed instantly. Park officials stated that although the perimeter is fenced off, animals such as deer occasionally get in.

Ultimate in popular culture
Ultimate was recreated as "The Storm" in the "Katie's Dreamland" scenario in the original RollerCoaster Tycoon PC game.

References

External links 

 Ultimate Review and Photos on T-Park
 The Ultimate on Coasterpedia

Amusement rides based on rail transport
Roller coasters in the United Kingdom
Roller coasters introduced in 1991
1991 establishments in England